"Madhouse" is a song by American thrash metal band Anthrax, released in 1985 on Megaforce Records and Island Records. The song is about going insane.

Background
"Madhouse" was released as the only single and third track from the group's second full album, Spreading the Disease. The song is written in an up-tempo time signature, with heavy distorted guitar riffs.

It has become a staple of live concerts, and has also appeared on Anthrax's "best of" album, Anthrology: No Hit Wonders (1985–1991). In 2009, the track was named the 46th best hard rock song of all time by VH1.

The 12" vinyl features a cover version of the Sex Pistols song "God Save the Queen".

Music video
A music video was produced, which features the band performing in an insane asylum with several mental patients moving along to the tune.

Appearances
This song is featured in the 2002 video game Grand Theft Auto: Vice City. It is featured on the in-game radio station "V-Rock".
A cover version of this song was included in the 2006 rhythm game  Guitar Hero II.
This song was featured in an episode of the MTV series Nitro Circus.
A live version of this song was available as downloadable content for the Rock Band series of rhythm games.

Covers
 The heavy metal band Pantera played the song live in their set in 1986-88
 Canadian thrash metal band Mortillery included a cover of the song as a bonus track on their 2013 album Origin of Extinction.

Personnel
Joey Belladonna – lead vocals
Dan Spitz – lead guitar, backing vocals
Scott Ian – rhythm guitar, backing vocals
Frank Bello – bass, backing vocals
Charlie Benante – drums

References

1985 songs
Anthrax (American band) songs
Songs written by Joey Belladonna
Songs written by Dan Spitz
Songs written by Scott Ian
Songs written by Frank Bello
Songs written by Charlie Benante
Megaforce Records singles
Island Records singles